The National Research Act was enacted by the 93rd United States Congress and signed into law by President Richard Nixon on July 12, 1974, after a series of congressional hearings on human-subjects research, directed by Senator Edward Kennedy. The National Research Act created the National Commission for the Protection of Human Subjects of Biomedical and Behavioral Research to develop guidelines for human subject research and to oversee and regulate the use of human experimentation in medicine. The National Research Act issued Title 45, Part 46 of the Code of Federal Regulations: Protection of Human Subjects. The National Research Act is overseen by the Office of Human Research Protections.  The Act also formalized a regulated IRB process through local institutional review boards, also overseen by the Office of Human Research Protections.

The National Research Act gained traction as a response to the infamous Tuskegee syphilis study.

See also
Human experimentation in the United States
Belmont Report
Eugenics in the United States
Unethical human experimentation
Human rights in the United States
Project MKUltra
Tuskegee syphilis experiment

References

External links
 Electronic Code of Federal Regulations. Title 45: Public Welfare. Subtitle A. Subchapter A. Part 46: PROTECTION OF HUMAN SUBJECTS

United States federal health legislation
1974 in law
Human subject research in the United States